The 1991 IBM OS/2 Fiesta Bowl, was a post-season college football bowl game between the Penn State Nittany Lions and the Tennessee Volunteers, played January 1, 1992, at Sun Devil Stadium in Tempe, Arizona.

This game marked the end of Sunkist sponsorship, which had been title sponsor since 1985 and the beginning of IBM's.  This game also marked Penn State's fifth appearance and Tennessee's first in the Fiesta Bowl.

References

Fiesta Bowl
Fiesta Bowl
Penn State Nittany Lions football bowl games
Tennessee Volunteers football bowl games
Fiesta Bowl
January 1992 sports events in the United States